Heartbeat in the Brain is a 1970 documentary film produced and directed by Amanda Feilding, an advocate of trepanation. It was filmed by Joseph Mellen.

Summary
In the film, Feilding, a 27-year-old student at the time, drills a hole in her forehead with a dentist's drill. In the documentary, surgical scenes alternate with motion studies of Feilding's pet pigeon Birdie.

Release and rediscovery
In 1978, Feilding screened the movie at the Suydam Gallery in New York. More than one audience member fainted during the climax.

The 1998 documentary A Hole in the Head contains footage from Heartbeat in the Brain.

The documentary, long believed to be lost, was publicly screened at the Institute of Contemporary Arts, London on 28 April 2011.

References

External links
MUBI
IMDb
VICE's interview with filmmaker about the 1970 short documentary

1970 films
1970 documentary films
British documentary films
Body modification
1970s rediscovered films
Rediscovered British films
1970s British films